The Debbie Reynolds Show is an American sitcom which aired on the NBC television network during the 1969–70 television season. The series was produced by Filmways.

Synopsis
Debbie Reynolds portrayed Debbie Thompson, a housewife married to Jim, a successful sportswriter for the Los Angeles Sun.  Jim was portrayed by actor Don Chastain;  his boss and brother-in-law was played by longtime television actor Tom Bosley. Reynolds' attempts to amuse herself were regarded as being reminiscent of those of Lucille Ball on Here's Lucy.

Creator/producer Jess Oppenheimer was the original producer and co-creator of I Love Lucy. The show also employed Bob Carroll Jr., and Madelyn Davis, two longtime Lucy writers.

NBC was selling advertising time for cigarette commercials against Reynolds' wishes (even though she was assured no cigarette ads would be seen during the program). After Reynolds threatened to quit the show, American Brands (formerly known as American Tobacco) withdrew sponsorship. To make up for NBC's lost ad revenue, Reynolds agreed to give back to the network their guarantee of a second year of airing the program, as well as an NBC-backed film, What's the Matter with Helen?, in which she starred, and her ownership in a subsequent NBC-produced series.

Cast
Debbie Reynolds as Debbie Thompson
Don Chastain as Jim Thompson
Patricia Smith as Charlotte Landers
Tom Bosley as Bob Landers

Episodes

In popular culture
Monty Python's Flying Circus spoofed the series in a sketch primarily written by John Cleese and Graham Chapman entitled "The Attila the Hun Show". It pokes fun at The Debbie Reynolds Show (the opening title sequence in particular, which the Pythons closely parodied), as well as American comedy in general.

References

 Brooks, Tim and Marsh, Earle, The Complete Directory to Prime Time Network and Cable TV Shows

External links
 

1969 American television series debuts
1970 American television series endings
1960s American sitcoms
1970s American sitcoms
English-language television shows
NBC original programming
Television series about marriage
Television series by MGM Television
Television series by Filmways
Television shows set in Los Angeles